The women's team competition at the 2016 European Judo Championships was held on 24 April at the TatNeft Arena in Kazan, Russia.

Results

Repechage

References

External links
 

Wteam
European Women's Team Judo Championships
EU 2016
European Wteam